M.P.Nachimuthu M.Jaganathan Engineering College (MPNMJEC) is a college of engineering founded by  J. Sudhanandhen Mudaliyar of 58 acres located in Chennimalai, Erode district, Tamil Nadu, India.

This is a separate institution from sengunthar group of institutions

Affiliations
This college is affiliated with Anna University.

External links

Engineering colleges in Tamil Nadu
Colleges affiliated to Anna University
Universities and colleges in Erode district